The 1939 Chicago Maroons football team was an American football team that represented the University of Chicago during the 1939 Big Ten Conference football season. In their seventh and final season under head coach Clark Shaughnessy, the Maroons compiled a 2–6 record, finished in last place in the Big Ten Conference, and were outscored by their opponents by a combined total of 308 to 37. Against stronger opponents, the team was soundly defeated, 85–0 against Michigan, and 61–0 against both Ohio State and Harvard, 47–0 against Virginia, and 46–0 against Illinois.

The 1939 season was described in the press as the worst season in Chicago Maroons football history. The school's academic demands had greatly reduced the personnel available to field a quality football team, and the Maroons had not won a game against a Big Ten opponent since 1936.

In December 1939, after 48 seasons of competition, the University of Chicago's board of trustees announced that, the school would no longer field a football team.

Schedule

References

Chicago
Chicago Maroons football seasons
Chicago Maroons football